Kord Mahalleh (also Romanized as Kord Maḩalleh) is a village in Gasht Rural District, in the Central District of Fuman County, Gilan Province, Iran. At the 2006 census, its population was 2,182, in 570 families.

References 

Populated places in Fuman County